Morsam Fashions is a North America manufacturer and designer of women's Lounge wearlingerie Robes and  sleepwear.  Morsam Fashions is known for its division called Jasmine Rose which is sold in department stores across North America. Morsam is the second largest design and importer of ladies' robes and lounge wear in North America. Its imports represent 8% of all the robes imported from China into the USA and Canada. Morsam as a whole imports over 3,000,000 units per year.

The Morsam group's product line includes women's sleepwear, lounge wear, and robes. The products are marketed under the brand names Jasmine Rose, Morning Glory, and Noire as well as various private label brands for major chains.  Morsam fashions also licenses the Brands of Jones New York Buffalo Danskin.

History
Morsam Fashions was started in Montreal, Quebec, Canada, in 1917 by two Romanian brothers named Samuel Lupovich and Moe Lupovich who came to Montreal by boat as young boys. The company started off as a women's uniform company.  It was later bought by their grandson Steven Lupovich, who is the President of the company.

References

Clothing retailers of the United States
Clothing retailers of Canada